Carphina ligneola is a species of longhorn beetles of the subfamily Lamiinae. It was described by Henry Walter Bates in 1865, and is known from northern Brazil and French Guiana.

References

Beetles described in 1865
Carphina